Zikmund Winter (27 December 1846 - 12 June 1912) was a Czech writer and historian.  The author of many historical novels and essays, he maintained an interest in Bohemian life from the fifteenth to seventeenth centuries. He died in 1912 and he was buried in Vinohrady Cemetery.

Selected works 
 Mistr Kampanus

References

Sources 
 South Bohemia and Bohemian Forest

1846 births
1912 deaths
Czech male writers
19th-century Czech historians
Czech historical novelists
20th-century Czech historians